Anton Leader (December 23, 1913 – July 1, 1988) was an American television director. He was born in Boston, Massachusetts, on December 23, 1913. He directed radio dramas in New York in the 1940s and moved to Los Angeles in 1948. Subsequently, he worked as a free-lancer for Universal Studios and Columbia Pictures, among others. From the middle 1950s to the middle 1970s he directed many episodes of the popular television series of that era. Known as "Tony" to friends and colleagues, his screen credits alternated between "Tony Leader" and the more formal "Anton M. Leader." He died in Los Angeles, California, on July 1, 1988.

Family
Leader was married to his wife, Rosalind , for 43 years. He was father to a son, Zachary and a daughter, Zoe.

Years in Radio
Leader directed multiple episodes of popular dramatic radio series of the 1940s, including "Murder at Midnight," "Words at War," and others.

Filmography, TV and Film Director

Filmography, Producer

References

External links

1913 births
1988 deaths
Film directors from Massachusetts